Antonio Manuel Ruiz Fernández (born 20 February 1977), commonly known as Romerito, is a Spanish retired footballer who played mainly as a defensive midfielder, and is the manager of Xerez Deportivo FC.

Playing career
Born in Seville, Andalusia, Romerito started his career with local side CD Cabecense before moving to Xerez CD in 1997. Initially assigned to the reserves, he was exclusively used in the main squad, making his professional debut on 14 September 1997 by coming on as a half-time substitute for Fernando Román in a 0–0 Segunda División away draw against CD Logroñés.

In 1999, Romerito signed for RCD Mallorca, and was assigned to the B-team in Segunda División B. He made his first team – and La Liga – debut on 17 January 2000, starting and scoring the opener in a 1–2 loss at Real Madrid.

In 2001, Romerito agreed to a deal with Recreativo de Huelva in the second division, but left for Hércules CF in the following January after being rarely used. He would resume his career mainly in the third level in the following years, representing CF Extremadura, SD Compostela, Écija Balompié, Linares CF, Águilas CF, Deportivo Alavés, Lucena CF, Real Balompédica Linense and Atlético Sanluqueño CF.

In August 2013, Romerito joined Xerez Deportivo FC, and helped the club in three consecutive promotions to Primera Andaluza before retiring in June 2016, aged 39.

Coaching career
Immediately after retiring, Romerito started working as a youth manager at his last club Xerez Deportivo. On 4 November 2017, he was named manager of CD Rota in the fifth division, and achieved promotion to Tercera División with the club in 2019.

On 10 March 2020, Romerito left Rota to take over third division side Atlético Sanluqueño, and helped the side to avoid relegation. The following 7 April, however, he was sacked.

On 20 May 2021, Romerito was appointed at the helm of another club he represented as a player, Linense.

Managerial statistics

References

External links

1977 births
Living people
Footballers from Seville
Spanish footballers
Association football midfielders
La Liga players
Segunda División players
Segunda División B players
Tercera División players
Xerez CD footballers
RCD Mallorca B players
Recreativo de Huelva players
Hércules CF players
CF Extremadura footballers
SD Compostela footballers
Écija Balompié players
Linares CF players
Águilas CF players
Deportivo Alavés players
Lucena CF players
Real Balompédica Linense footballers
Atlético Sanluqueño CF players
Xerez Deportivo FC footballers
Spanish football managers
Primera Federación managers
Segunda División B managers
Tercera División managers